Norbert Hofmann (born 1 January 1972 in Mannheim) is a retired German football midfielder.

References

External links 
 

1972 births
Living people
Footballers from Mannheim
German footballers
Bundesliga players
2. Bundesliga players
SV Waldhof Mannheim players
VfL Bochum players
1. FC Saarbrücken players
TSG 1899 Hoffenheim players
TSG 1899 Hoffenheim II players
Association football midfielders